Snatchwood is a small suburb to the north of Pontypool, Torfaen in Wales. It is situated between Abersychan and Pontnewynydd (not to be confused with Pontnewydd, a suburb of nearby Cwmbran).

The majority (58.3 per cent) of homes in the area are owner-occupied but 14 per cent are rented from the local authority and 17.6 per cent are "other socially rented". The area has a population of 2,026

References

See also
Snatchwood Halt railway station, open from 1912 to 1953

Villages in Torfaen
Electoral wards of Torfaen